Deroca is a genus of moths belonging to the subfamily Drepaninae. It was erected by Francis Walker in 1855.

Species
Deroca hidda Swinhoe, 1900
Deroca hyalina Walker, 1855
Deroca inconclusa (Walker, 1856)
Deroca pulla Watson, 1957

References

Drepaninae
Drepanidae genera